Mathias Haarup (born 10 February 1996) is a Danish footballer who plays as a right-back or left-back for Hobro IK in Danish 1st Division.

Club career

Early career
At the age of four, Haarup started playing for local club Havndal Udbyneder IF, where he was coached by his own father, who began working for the club. He later signed for Hobro IK at the age of 12, where he had many friends from the talent-team. At this time, Haarup was playing as a forward. His last youth destination was Randers FC, which he joined at the age of 14. At this time, he was already involved with the first team.

Randers Freja
In 2015, Haarup was promoted to the Denmark Series team of Randers FC, because he became too old for playing for the U19 team and was not deemed good enough for the first team squad. Though, he was also training and playing for the reserve team of Randers. In 2016, he became the captain of the Denmark Series team.

In December 2016, Haarup went on a trial at Skive IK, without getting offered any contract at the end.

Brabrand IF
On 24 December 2016, Haarup signed for Danish 2nd Division club, Brabrand IF. He played 12 games for the club, before leaving in the summer 2017. This was announced by Brabrand IF in June 2016. He was playing as a winger during his time in Brabrand.

Hobro IK
After playing in the Denmark Series and a half year in the Danish 2nd Division, he finally reached the top league, after re-signing for newly-promoted Danish Superliga club Hobro IK on 21 June 2017.

Haarup got his debut for Hobro IK on 14 August 2017. He started on the bench, but replaced Danny Olsen in the 89th minute in a 1-1 draw against AaB in the Danish Superliga.

Jerv
On 11 March 2022, Haarup signed for Norwegian Eliteserien club FK Jerv until the end of 2023.

Return to Hobro
At the end of January 2023, Haarup returned - once again - to Hobro IK, signing a deal until the end of the season.

References

External links
 

1996 births
Living people
Danish men's footballers
Danish expatriate men's footballers
Association football defenders
Footballers from Aarhus
Danish Superliga players
Danish 2nd Division players
Eliteserien players
Hobro IK players
Brabrand IF players
Randers FC players
FK Jerv players
Danish expatriate sportspeople in Norway
Expatriate footballers in Norway